Things Are Getting Better Already (German: Es wird schon wieder besser) is a 1932 German comedy film directed by Kurt Gerron and starring Dolly Haas, Heinz Rühmann and Paul Otto. It was shot at the Babelsberg Studios in Berlin. The film's sets were designed by the art director Julius von Borsody.

Cast

References

Bibliography
 Waldman, Harry. Nazi Films in America, 1933-1942. McFarland, 2008.

External links

1932 films
1932 comedy films
German comedy films
Films of the Weimar Republic
1930s German-language films
Films directed by Kurt Gerron
UFA GmbH films
Films shot at Babelsberg Studios
1930s German films